The Chécatica River is a salmon river in the Côte-Nord region of Quebec, Canada. It empties into the Gulf of Saint Lawrence.

Location

In some sections it widens into lakes, including Lake Chécatica.
The bay is a waterbody with an irregular outline, containing many points, inlets and islands.
Chécatica Island is at the entrance to the bay.
Along the coast to the west, near one of the inlets, there is a small hamlet named Shekatika.
The mouth of the Chécatica River is in the municipality of Saint-Augustin in Le Golfe-du-Saint-Laurent Regional County Municipality.

Name

The Innu call the river Netshikatikau Hipis or Netsheskatakau Shipis.
According to Father Georges Lemoine the name comes from shikatikau and means there are bushes beside the water.
Variants include Ouescatacou and Ouescatacouau.
On his first voyage in 1534 Jacques Cartier went by shallop to Chécatica, which he called Port de Jacques-Cartier.
He found indigenous people in quite large numbers.

Basin

It lies between the basins of the Coxipi River to the west and the Napetipi River to the east.
It is partly in the unorganized territory of Petit-Mécatina and partly in the municipality of Saint-Augustin.

A map of the ecological regions of Quebec shows the river in sub-regions 6o-T, 6n-T and 6m-T of the east spruce/moss subdomain.
In 2002 the northern part of the river, to the east of Lake Tooker, was in territory that was seriously affected by hemlock looper moths (Lambdina fiscellaria).
The river is recognized as an Atlantic salmon river.
There are also brook trout in the river.

Notes

Sources

Rivers of Côte-Nord